Ana Maria Marković (born 9 November 1999) is a Croatian footballer who plays as a forward for Swiss Women's Super League club Grasshopper and the Croatia national team.

Early life 
Marković is of Croatian descent from her mother's side, who comes from Split. Marković was born in Split, and moved with her family to Switzerland aged 12, growing up in Zürich.

Club career 
Aged 14, Marković began playing football in Switzerland; she stated that she began playing after feeling motivated from the growth of women's football. While in Switzerland she featured for U21 squad at FC Zurich for three seasons before making the move to Grasshopper.

International career 
Having caught the eye of the Croatian Football Federation while playing for Grasshopper in Switzerland, Marković was called up to play for the Croatia national team.

Career statistics

Club

International goals

Honours
Grasshopper Club Zürich Frauen
 
Swiss Women's Cup: 2021–22 runner-up

References

External links
 
 

1999 births
Living people
Footballers from Split, Croatia
Croatian women's footballers
Croatian emigrants to Switzerland
Women's association football forwards
Grasshopper Club Zürich (women) players
Swiss Women's Super League players
Croatia women's international footballers
Swiss women's footballers